

Baroque
Charles-Amador Martin (1648–1711)

Classical
Joseph Quesnel (1746–1809)

Romantic
Stephen Codman (c. 1796–1852)
James P. Clarke (1807/8–1877)
Robert Ambrose (1824–1908)
Jean-Baptiste Labelle (1825–1898)
Ernest Gagnon (1834–1915)
Adélard Joseph Boucher (1835–1912)
Frantz Jehin-Prume (1839–1899)
Calixa Lavallée (1842–1891)
Gustave Gagnon (1842–1930)
Romain-Octave Pelletier I (1843–1927)
Joseph-A. Fowler (1845–1917)
Guillaume Couture (1851–1915)
J. E. P. Aldous (1853–1934)
Alexis Contant (1858–1918)
Alfred De Sève (1858–1927)
W. O. Forsyth (1859–1937)

Post romantic/Early modern
Louis-Phillipe Laurendeau (1861–1916)
Humfrey Anger (1862–1913)
Charles A.E. Harriss (1862–1929)
Achille Fortier (1864–1939)
Clarence Lucas (1866–1947)
Paul Ambrose (1868–1941)
Frédéric Pelletier (1870–1944)
W. H. Hewlett (1873–1940)
Joseph Allard (1873–1947)
Romain Pelletier (1875–1953)
Donald Heins (1878–1949)
Henri Miro (1879–1950)
Healey Willan (1880–1968)
Robert Nathaniel Dett (1882–1943)
Alfred La Liberté (1882–1952)
W.H. Anderson (1882–1955)
Robert Graham Manson (1883–1950)
J.-J. Gagnier (1885–1949)
Albertine Morin-Labrecque (1886 or 1890–1957)
Albert Chamberland (1886–1975)
Frank Marsales (1886–1975)
Henri Gagnon (1887–1961)
Allard de Ridder (1887–1966)
Rodolphe Mathieu (1890–1962)
Lydia Boucher (1890–1971)
Claude Champagne (1891–1965)
Alexander Chuhaldin (1892–1951)
René Gagnier (1892–1951)
Omer Létourneau (1891–1983)
Léo-Pol Morin (1892–1941)
Ernest MacMillan (1893–1973)
Alfred Mignault (1895–1961)
Joseph Beaulieu (1895–1965)
Eugène Lapierre (1899–1970)
Sophie Carmen Eckhardt-Gramatté (1899–1974)
Leila Fletcher (1899–1988)

Modern/Early postmodern
Colin McPhee (1900–1964)
Hector Gratton (1900–1970)
Isabelle Delorme (1900–1991)
Lionel Daunais (1901–1982)
Gabriel Cusson (1903–1972)
Morris Davis (1904–1968)
Allan McIver (1904–1969)
Conrad Bernier (1904–1988)
Charles Houdret (1905–after 1964)
Bruce Holder (1905–1987)
Albertine Caron-Legris (1906–1972)
Murray Adaskin (1906–2002)
Boris Berlin (1907–2001)
Lucien Martin (1908–1950)
Jean Coulthard (1908–2000)
Jean Deslauriers (1909–1978)
Walter MacNutt (1910–1996)
Charles Jones (1910–1997)
Patricia Blomfield Holt (1910–2003)
Otto Joachim (1910–2010)
Keith Bissell (1912–1992)
Graham George (1912–1993)
Johana Harris (1912–1995)
Barbara Pentland (1912–2000)
Lucio Agostini (1913–1996)
Violet Archer (1913–2000)
John Weinzweig (1913–2006)
Henry Brant (1913–2008)
Hugh Le Caine (1914–1977)
Émilien Allard (1915–1977)
Ricky Hyslop (1915–1998)
Alexander Brott (1915–2005)
James Gayfer (1916–1997)
Jean Papineau-Couture (1916–2000)
Gaston Allaire (1916–2011)
Richard Johnston (1917–1997)
Herbert Belyea (1917–2001)
Samuel Dolin (1917–2002)
Robert Farnon (1917–2005)
Oskar Morawetz (1917–2007)
Godfrey Ridout (1918–1984)
Gordon Delamont (1918–1981)
Lorne Betts (1918–1985)
Louis Applebaum (1918–2000)
Gerald Bales (1919–2002)
Talivaldis Kenins (1919–2008)
István Anhalt (1919–2020)
Udo Kasemets (1919–2014)
Neil Chotem (1920–2008)
Robert Turner (1920–2012)
Howard Cable (1920–2016)
Robert Fleming (1921–1976)
Kelsey Jones (1922–2004)
Harry Freedman (1922–2005)
Jocelyne Binet (1923–1968)
Kenneth G. Mills (1923–2004)
Jack Kane (1924–1961)
Mort Garson (1924–2008)
Harry Somers (1925–1999)
Pierre Brabant (1925–2014)
Gérald Gagnier (1926–1961)
Victor Bouchard (1926–2011)
Alan Detweiler (1926–2012)
Raymond Daveluy (1926–2016)
François Morel (1926–2018)
Clermont Pépin (1926–2006)
Pierre Mercure (1927–1966)
John Beckwith (born 1927)
Dolores Claman (1927–2021)
Carleton Elliott (1928–2003)
Lloyd Blackman (1928–2014)
André Mathieu (1929–1968)
Serge Garant (1929–1986)
Alfred Kunz (1929–2019)
Alcides Lanza (born 1929)
Roger Matton (1929–2004)
Ron Collier (1930–2003)
Gustav Ciamaga (1930–2011)
Hugh Davidson (1930–2014)
Richard Hunt (1930–2011)
Ruth Lomon (1930–2017)
Milton Barnes (1931–2001)
F. R. C. Clarke (1931–2009)
Derek Holman (1931–2019)
Rudolf Komorous (born 1931)
Glenn Gould (1932–1982)
Michael Colgrass (1932–2019)
Boyd McDonald (born 1932)
Walter Buczynski (born 1933)
R. Murray Schafer (born 1933)
Ben McPeek (1934–1981)
Srul Irving Glick (1934–2002)
Norma Beecroft (born 1934)
Jack Behrens (born 1935)
John Arpin (1936–2007)
Milan Kymlicka (1936–2008)
Léon Bernier (1936–2011)
Malcolm Forsyth (1936–2011)
Hagood Hardy (1937–1997)
Ann Southam (1937–2010)
Michael Conway Baker (born 1937)
Diana McIntosh (born 1937)
Jacques Hétu (1938–2010)
Alain Gagnon (1938–2017)
Robert Aitken (born 1939)
Victor Davies (born 1939)
Bruce Mather (born 1939)
Marc Bélanger (born 1940)
John Wyre (1941–2006)
Brian Cherney (born 1942)
José Evangelista (1943―2023)
Larry Lake (1943–2013)
Anne Lauber (born 1943)
John Mills-Cockell (born 1943)
James Montgomery (born 1943)
John Hawkins (1944–2007)
John Fodi (1944–2009)
Bruce Carlson (born 1944)
Raynald Arseneault (1945–1995)

Contemporary/Postmodern
Bruce Cockburn (born 1945)
Ronald Hannah (born 1945)
Yves Daoust (born 1946)
René Dupéré (born 1946)
Yves Lapierre (born 1946)
Michel Longtin (born 1946)
Nikolai Korndorf (1947–2001)
Walter Boudreau (born 1947)
Clifford Ford (born 1947)
Steven Gellman (born 1947)
Peter Paul Koprowski (born 1947)
Gene Martynec (born 1947)
Claude Vivier (1948–1983)
Stephen Brown (born 1948)
Jim Hiscott (born 1948)
Lubomyr Melnyk (born 1948)
Marjan Mozetich (born 1948)
Chan Ka Nin (born 1949)
David Foster (born 1949)
Fariborz Lachini (born 1949)
Alexina Louie (born 1949)
Denis Bédard (born 1950)
Christian Calon (born 1950)
Stephen Chatman  (born 1950)
Michael Matthews (born 1950)
John Burke (1951–2020)
Lisle Ellis (born 1951)
Denis Gougeon (born 1951)
Peter Allen (born 1952)
Gilles Bellemare (born 1952)
Jacques Faubert (born 1952)
David MacIntyre (born 1952)
Peter Hannan (born 1953)
Christos Hatzis (born 1953)
Scott Irvine (born 1953)
Robin Minard (born 1953)
Gary Kulesha (born 1954)
Denys Bouliane (born 1955)
Eleanor Joanne Daley (born 1955)
Jean Derome (born 1955)
William Beauvais (born 1956)
Timothy Brady (born 1956)
Paul Dolden (born 1956)
Larysa Kuzmenko (born 1956)
Linda Bouchard (born 1957)
René Lussier (born 1957)
Mychael Danna (born 1958)
Colin Eatock (born 1958)
Andrew Paul MacDonald (born 1958)
John Abram (born 1959)
James Gelfand (born 1959)
James Keelaghan (born 1959)
Omar Daniel (born 1960)
Amin Bhatia (born 1961)
John Burge (born 1961)
Andrew Ager (born 1962)
Ned Bouhalassa (born 1962)
Arne Eigenfeldt (born 1962)
Alain Lefèvre (born 1962)
Leo Marchildon (born 1962)
Allison Cameron (born 1963)
Veronika Krausas (born 1963)
Edwin Orion Brownell (born 1964)
Benoît Charest (born 1964)
Jeff Danna (born 1964)
Brent Lee (born 1964)
Allan Gilliland (born 1965)
Francois Couture (born 1965)
John Estacio (born 1966)
Melissa Hui (born 1966)
David Kristian (born 1967)
André Éric Létourneau (born 1967)
Lesley Barber (born 1968)
Éric Morin (born 1969)
Jocelyn Morlock (born 1969)
Desmond Gaspar (born 1970)
Chris Harman (born 1970)
Analia Llugdar (born 1972)
Emily Doolittle (born 1972)
Derek Charke (born 1974)
Kati Agócs (born 1975)
Jimmie LeBlanc (born 1977)
Andrew Staniland (born 1977)
Aaron Gervais (born 1980)
Christopher Mayo (born 1980)
Samuel Andreyev (born 1981)
Kyle Bobby Dunn (born 1986)
Sarah Davachi (born 1987)

Jazz and other composers (listed alphabetically)

Moe Koffman (1928–2001)
Phil Nimmons (born 1923)
Robert Normandeau (born 1955)
Oscar O'Brien (1892–1958)
Michael Oesterle (born 1968)
John Oliver (born 1959)
Charles O'Neill (1882–1964)
John Oswald (born 1953)
Owen Pallett (born 1979)
Donald Patriquin (born 1938)
Trevor W. Payne (born 1948)
Kenneth Peacock (1922–2000)
Paul Pedersen (born 1935)
Oscar Peterson (1925–2007)
Michel Perrault (born 1925)
Jean Piché (born 1951)
Dave Pierce (born 1972)
Randolph Peters (born 1959)
Benoît Poirier (1882–1965)
Paul Pratt (1894–1967)
Albert Pratz (1914–1995)
André Prévost (1934–2001)
Harry Puddicombe (1870–1953)
Donald Quan (born 1962)
Allan Rae (born 1942)
Imant Raminsh (born 1943)
Jan Randall (born 1952)
Eldon Rathburn (1916–2008)
Elizabeth Raum (born 1945)
John Rea (born 1944)
William Reed (1859–1945)
Bill Richards (1923–1995)
Doug Riley (1945–2007)
André Ristic (born 1972)
Normand Roger (born 1949)
Stan Rogers (1949–1983)
James Rolfe (born 1961)
Ivan Romanoff (1914–1997)
Clark Ross (born 1957)
Myke Roy (born 1950)
Stéphane Roy (born 1959)
Welford Russell (c.1901–1975)
Jeffrey Ryan (born 1962)
Marc Sabat (born 1965)
Charles Wugk Sabatier (1819–1862)
Patrick Saint-Denis (born 1975)
Micheline Coulombe Saint-Marcoux (1938–1985)
Herbert Sanders (1878–1938)
Armando Santiago (born 1932)
Charles Sauvageau (1807–1849)
Oliver Schroer (1956–2008)
Ernest Seitz (1892–1978)
Paul Shaffer (born 1949)
Rodney Sharman (born 1958)
Howard Shore (born 1946)
Anita Sleeman (1930–2011)
Linda Catlin Smith (born 1957)
Leo Smith (1881–1952)
David Squires (born 1957)
Paul Steenhuisen (born 1965)
Ben Steinberg (born 1930)
Donald Steven (born 1945)
Fred Stone (1935–1986)
Timothy Sullivan (born 1954)
Norman Symonds (1920–1998)
Boleslaw Szczeniowski (1898–1995)
Robert Talbot (1893–1954)
Georges-Émile Tanguay (1893–1964)
Oscar Ferdinand Telgmann (1855–1946)
Steve Tittle (born 1935)
Peter Togni (born 1959)
Roman Toi (born 1916)
Jerry Toth (1928–1999)
Rudy Toth (1925–2009)
Bramwell Tovey (born 1953)
Jiří Traxler (born 1912)
Amédée Tremblay (1876–1949)
George Tremblay (1911–1982)
Gilles Tremblay (born 1932)
Barry Truax (born 1947)
Ian Tyson (born September 25, 1933)
Owen Underhill (born 1954)
Jean Vallerand (1915–1994)
Stéphane Venne (born 1941)
Benoît Verdickt (1884–1970)
Joseph Vézina (1849–1924)
Albert Viau (1910–2001)
Michael Vincent (born 1976)
Augustus Stephen Vogt (1861–1926)
Calvin Vollrath (born 1960)
Arnold Walter (1902–1973)
Ruth Watson Henderson (born 1932)
Frank Welsman (1873–1952)
John Welsman (born 1955)
Hildegard Westerkamp (born 1946)
Dinuk Wijeratne
Eric Wild (1910–1989)
Rick Wilkins (born 1937)
Charles Wilson (born 1931)
Scott Wilson (born 1969)
Édouard Woolley (1916–1991)
Kathleen Yearwood  (born 1958)
Gayle Young  (born 1950)
Maurice Zbriger (1896–1981)
Rui Shi Zhuo (born 1956)
Joel Zimmerman (born 1981)
León Zuckert (1904–1992)

Canadian classical composers
Canadian